Oreta perobliquilinea is a moth in the family Drepanidae. It was described by William Warren in 1923. It is found on Peninsular Malaysia, in Singapore and on Borneo.

References

Moths described in 1923
Drepaninae
Moths of Asia